Antonios Tsakiropoulos (born 1 July 1969) is a former Greek male volleyball player. He was part of the Greece men's national volleyball team. He competed with the national team at the 2004 Summer Olympics in Athens, Greece. He played for Olympiacos from 1995 to 2007.

See also
 Greece at the 2004 Summer Olympics

References

External links
 profile, club career, info at greekvolley.gr (in Greek)

1969 births
Living people
Greek men's volleyball players
Olympiacos S.C. players
A.C. Orestias players
People from Evros (regional unit)
Volleyball players at the 2004 Summer Olympics
Olympic volleyball players of Greece
Sportspeople from Eastern Macedonia and Thrace